Carlos Briggs (born March 2, 1963) is a retired American professional basketball player from Detroit, Michigan. Since retiring from professional basketball, Carlos Briggs has enjoyed a successful coaching career at the high school and collegiate levels, and is currently an assistant coach at Florida A&M.

Basketball career
After high school, he stayed in Michigan to play two years for SchoolCraft Community College during his freshman (1982–83) and sophomore (1983–84) seasons. Briggs led the nation in scoring both years, averaging 30.1 points per game his freshman year and 34.2 points his sophomore year. He was a JUCO All-American in 1983–84.

Briggs transferred to Baylor University (an NCAA Division I school) in 1984–85 and contributed 20.4 ppg and 3.5 apg for the Bears. Briggs was the fourth round draft pick for the San Antonio Spurs in 1986.

He played for the Rockford Lightning in the Continental Basketball Association in the 1988–89 season and had a brief stint with the Youngstown Pride in the World Basketball League.

Philippine stint
Carlos Briggs went to play for the most popular ballclub Añejo Rum 65 in the Philippine Basketball Association from October to December 1989, averaging an incredible 62.1 points in 24 games, leading his team to a second-place finish, he made quite a record of sorts in scoring in that conference, once hitting 89 points in a single game.

References

External links
Trinity Valley coaching bio

1964 births
Living people
American expatriate basketball people in the Philippines
American men's basketball players
Barangay Ginebra San Miguel players
Basketball coaches from New Hampshire
Basketball players from Massachusetts
Baylor Bears men's basketball players
Detroit Mercy Titans men's basketball coaches
Junior college men's basketball coaches in the United States
Junior college men's basketball players in the United States
Rockford Lightning players
San Antonio Spurs draft picks
Schoolcraft College alumni
Sportspeople from Nashua, New Hampshire
Basketball players from Detroit
Point guards